Tillandsia caliginosa is a plant species in the genus Tillandsia. This species is native to Argentina and Bolivia

References

caliginosa
Flora of Bolivia